UFC 40: Vendetta was a mixed martial arts event held by the Ultimate Fighting Championship on November 22, 2002, at the MGM Grand Arena on the Las Vegas Strip in Paradise, Nevada. The event was broadcast live on pay per view in the United States, and later released on DVD.

History
UFC 40 contained one of the biggest, most important and most anticipated fights in UFC history, a UFC Light Heavyweight Championship fight between rivals Tito Ortiz and Ken Shamrock. Shamrock, a popular legendary fighter and former champion from the UFC's early years, was returning to the UFC for the first time since 1996. The fight was coined "the biggest fight in UFC history" by the UFC during the event.

UFC 40 also contained a Welterweight Title Bout between Matt Hughes and Gil Castillo. Tank Abbott provided an interview in the octagon after UFC President Dana White had announced Abbott would return to the octagon on a 3-fight deal.

Bruce Buffer has said many times that the fight between Ken Shamrock and Tito Ortiz was one of the greatest fights he has ever seen, and that the energy from the 13,700 fans that night was one of the greatest feelings he has ever experienced.

UFC 40 was also the first live UFC Pay Per View event to be aired on Australian cable television.  Jeff Osborne continued as the behind-the-scenes interviewer for UFC 40.

UFC 40 continued to allow the fighters to enter the octagon with their own music playing.

Significance
UFC 40 was a pivotal event for Zuffa. The anticipation for Ken Shamrock vs. Tito Ortiz resulted in a buyrate that was roughly double the buyrates of the previous Zuffa UFC shows. After initially losing a lot of money, UFC 40 showed Zuffa that it was possible to make money with the UFC. This was important for the sport of mixed martial arts because had UFC 40 been a failure, the possibility existed that Zuffa would have eventually sold the UFC and cut their losses; Zuffa was largely responsible for bringing mixed martial arts to the North American mainstream audience in the coming years, and without them, there was a good possibility the sport of mixed martial arts would have remained underground outside Japan. UFC 40 was a near sellout of 13,022 at the MGM Grand Garden Arena for a gate of $1,540,000, a UFC record at that point.

UFC 40 also gained mainstream exposure for mixed martial arts. Ken Shamrock and Tito Ortiz both appeared on The Best Damn Sports Show Period and engaged in trash talk on live television. Shamrock and Ortiz's fight also gained mainstream media attention from massive media outlets such as ESPN and USA Today, something that was unprecedented for mixed martial arts at that point in time. In fact, Danny Sheridan, the USA Today oddsmaker, was present during the card. UFC President Dana White credited Shamrock for the show's success. White said, "the reason we did so well on UFC 40 was because of Ken Shamrock and the fact that everyone knew who he was."

Long time UFC referee "Big" John McCarthy said that he felt UFC 40 was the turning point in whether or not the sport of MMA would survive in America.

Results

See also
 Ultimate Fighting Championship
 List of UFC champions
 List of UFC events
 2002 in UFC
 Latest UFC News

References

External links
 Official UFC website
 UFC 40 fights review

Ultimate Fighting Championship events
2002 in mixed martial arts
Mixed martial arts in Las Vegas
2002 in sports in Nevada
MGM Grand Garden Arena